Taranaki Rugby League is the local sporting body responsible for the administration of Rugby league in the Taranaki region of New Zealand. The TRL are represented by the Taranaki rugby league team. They are in the Mid-Central zone along with the Manawatu Rugby League.

Regional senior competition
Five Taranaki senior clubs compete in the Western Alliance, alongside five clubs from the Manawatū-Whanganui region. 
Taranaki clubs in the Western Alliance include:
Coastal Cobras
Bell Block Marist Dragons
Hawera Hawks
Waitara Bears
Western Suburb Tigers
Normanby/Okaiawa Knights

History
The Taranaki Rugby League was founded with the help of Adam Lile, one of the members of the 1907-1908 "All Golds" tour.

In 2008 the Taranaki Rugby League named its Team of the Century: Dave Watson; Babe Hooker; Ron McKay; Willie Talau; Ernest Buckland; Tony Kemp; Issac Luke; Bruce Gall; Howie Tamati; Wille Southorn; Graeme West; Adam Lile; Barry Harvey. Bench: Jack McLeod; Fred White; Lance Moir; Jim Parker; Charles Hunt.

Referee of the century: Graham Church. Coach of the century: Alan Marshall. Player of the century: Wille Southorn.

Lion Red Cup

Between 1994 and 1996, the Taranaki region was represented by the Taranaki Rockets in the Lion Red Cup competition. The Rockets were notable for having Willie Talau, John Farrar on their roster, both players played for their Club Western Tigers Wille who now competes in the Super League with St. Helens.and John Farrar who was selected and  played for the New Zealand Maori Rugby league team against Great Britain and Papua New Guine.

Bartercard Cup

Taranaki was represented in the Bartercard Cup competition for two years by the Taranaki Wildcats. They finished in last place both seasons, before folding at the completion of the 2003 season.

National provincial competition
Taranaki Rugby League were awarded a place in the new six-team National Provincial Competition which began in 2008. In the first season the team finished in sixth place.

References

External links
Taranaki Rugby League TRL homepage

Bellblock Marist Dragons
 
 
Coastal Cobras
 
Western Suburbs Tigers
 
Waitara Bears
 
Normanby Okaiawa Knights
 
Hawera Hawks
 
Inglewood Sea Eagles
 

Rugby league in Taranaki
Rugby league governing bodies in New Zealand